The 2006 O'Byrne Cup was a Gaelic football competition played by the teams of Leinster GAA. The competition differs from the Leinster Senior Football Championship as it also features further education colleges.

O'Byrne Cup

O'Byrne Shield
Won by Longford, who defeated Wicklow in the final.

References

External links
Leinster G.A.A. Results 2006

O'Byrne Cup
O'Byrne Cup